Naftali (also spelled Naftula) Tzvi Labin of Zidichov (נפתלי צבי לאבין מזידיטשוב) (c. 1916 – March 6, 2009) was the Zidichover Rebbe. He was born in Ziditshoiv, Ukraine, which was then a province of the former Austro-Hungarian Empire, His father was a descendant of Rabbi Tzvi Hirsh of Zidichov and one of his succesors. He later replanted the movement in London, and then in Brooklyn, New York, and Monticello, New York.

Labin was very close to many rebbes of the previous generation, including Rabbi Yoel Teitelbaum of Satmar, Rabbi Aharon Rokeach of Belz, Rebbe Moshe Yitzchak Gevirtzman (Reb Itzikl) of Pshevorsk, and Rebbe Yaakov Leiser (Reb Yankele) of Pshevorsk.

Zidichov today
After the Rebbe of Ziditchov, Naftali Tzvi Labin, died, his son Rabbi Yeshaya Labin was crowned as Grand Rebbe of Ziditchov.

Aphorism
"If you listen to, and you do what and when evil wants you to do, evil owns you. If you say to evil ok I’ll do it, 'just let me have 5 minutes before doing it' you are still his friend, but he does not own you."

Children
Rabbi Sender Lipa Labin
Rabbi Shlomo Dov Labin, rabbi of Zidichov-London
Rabbi Moshe Labin, Chareidim-Drubitsher Rebbe
Rabbi Yeshaya Labin, Zidichover Rabbi  
Rabbi Aharon Maier Labin, Bolchav Rov in Williamsburg
Rabbi Yitzchak Isaac Labin, Zidichover Rebbe in Bnei Brak

Rabbi Labin also has two daughters, who are both married to Hasidic rebbes:
Rebbe Dovid Kohn — the present Toldos Aharon Rebbe in Jerusalem
Rabbi Elimelech Segal-Loewy of Tosh — son of Rebbe Meshulam Feish

References
Geni.com

External links
The Tosh'er Hatzolah site

Labin, Naftali Tzvi
1916 births
2009 deaths
British Orthodox rabbis
Hasidic rabbis in Europe
American Hasidic rabbis
People from Zhydachiv